Tiptur Assembly constituency is one of the 224 constituencies in the Karnataka Legislative Assembly of Karnataka a south state of India. It is also part of Tumkur Lok Sabha constituency.

Members of Legislative Assembly

Mysore State
 1951: T. G. Thimme Gowda, Indian National Congress
 1957: K. P. Revannasiddappa, Praja Socialist Party
 1962: K. P. Revannasiddappa, Praja Socialist Party
 1967: M. S. Neelakantaswamy, Indian National Congress
 1967 (By-Poll): V. L. Shivappa, Praja Socialist Party
 1972: T. M. Manjunath, Indian National Congress (Organisation)

Karnataka State
 1978: V. L. Shivappa, Indian National Congress (Indira)
 1983: S. P. Gangadharappa, Indian National Congress
 1985: B. S. Chandrashekaraih, Janata Party
 1989: T. M. Manjunath, Indian National Congress
 1994: B. Nanjamari, Bharatiya Janata Party
 1999: K. Shadakshari, Indian National Congress
 2004: B. Nanjamari, Janata Dal (Secular)
 2008: B. C. Nagesh, Bharatiya Janata Party
 2013: K. Shadakshari, Indian National Congress
 2018: B. C. Nagesh, Bharatiya Janata Party

See also
 List of constituencies of Karnataka Legislative Assembly
 Tumkur district

References

Assembly constituencies of Karnataka
Tumkur district